TGR is an Italian news television series.

TGR may also refer to:
 TGR Motorsport
 Toyota Gazoo Racing
 Taieri Gorge Railway
 Tasmanian Government Railways
 Teton Gravity Research
 Terriblemente Guapo el Rey
 The Great Race (Thomas & Friends), a 2016 Thomas & Friends film